Sir James Graham, 1st Baronet (18 November 1753 – 21 March 1825) was a British Tory politician.

He was elected as a Member of Parliament (MP) for Cockermouth at the 1802 general election, but resigned that seat in 1805 to stand for Wigtown Burghs, where he was elected in July 1805.

At the 1806 general election he was returned as an MP for Cockermouth, where he was re-elected in 1807 and held the seat until 1812. At the 1812 general election he was returned for Carlisle, and held that seat until his death in 1825, aged 71.

He was made a baronet in 1808, of Kirkstall, Yorkshire.

References

External links 
 

1753 births
1825 deaths
Tory MPs (pre-1834)
Members of the Parliament of the United Kingdom for Scottish constituencies
Members of the Parliament of the United Kingdom for English constituencies
UK MPs 1802–1806
UK MPs 1806–1807
UK MPs 1807–1812
UK MPs 1812–1818
UK MPs 1818–1820
UK MPs 1820–1826
Baronets in the Baronetage of the United Kingdom
Members of the Parliament of the United Kingdom for Carlisle